Chunyang Hu (born April 15, 1970) is a professor at the Fudan University in China. She is nationally known for her research and writing on interpersonal communication, discourse analysis applied in communication.

Chunyang Hu has also done research and published books on discourse analysis, mobile communication and interpersonal interaction, and textbook on Interpersonal Communication. She translated the Sage Handbook of Interpersonal Communication from English into Chinese. She developed the course on interpersonal communication on Fudan campus. .

The courses Chunyang Hu taught are: interpersonal communication, political communication, mass media and culture, the introduction to communication studies, Media Convergence.

Chunyang Hu received her bachelor's (1990) from Sichuan University of China and master's (2000) degrees and her PhD (2005) from Fudan University. After receiving her PhD, she was employed at Fudan University and work with University journalism school of Fudan University and Information and Communication Study center of Fudan. In December 2015, Chunyang Hu was promoted to full professorship of Communication Studies. Since September 2015, she acts as academic publications reviewer for Routledge Press. Since September 2014, she performs as paper reviewer for Journal of Sociology and Anthropology.

In 2013–2014, Chunyang Hu, as research fellow, visited the Berkman KleinCenter for Internet &Society at Harvard University; In 2013, she, as visiting scholar, visited Brian Communication School at Purdue University; In 2011, she, as exchange faculty, taught at Hong Kong Chu Hai College; she, as exchange faculty, visited Cal State Fullerton.

List of publications (selected)

Books
Chunyang Hu (2007) : Discourse Analysis: A New Approach to Communication Studies.
Chunyang Hu (2012): The Quiet Noise and Perpetual Contact – Mobile Communication and Interpersonal Interaction.
Chunyang Hu, Hongyu Huang, Jianhua Yao(2013): The Political Economy of Communication (translation version.Author: Vincent Mosco) Shanghai.
Chunyang Hu, Hongyu Huang(2015): Sage Handbook of Interpersonal Communication ( translation version. Editor: Mark Knapp). Shanghai. Fudan University Press.
Chunyang Hu (2015): Interpersonal Communication (Textbook).

Articles in journals and chapters
Chunyang Hu (2015): A Research on Interpersonal Communication via Weichat.
Chunyang Hu (2015): A review on Interpersonal Communication Research: Based on EBSCO Database.
Chunyang Hu (2015): The New Directions of Interpersonal Communication.
Chunyang Hu (2015): The Theories on Computer-mediated Interpersonal Communication.
Chunyang Hu (2012): Mobile Communication and Transformation of Intimate Relationships.
Chunyang Hu, Yuhe Yao (2012) : Mobile, Communication & the Second Modernity: To Explain Mobile Communication Metaphysically. Academic Monthly 4, 28–32.
Chunyang Hu, Xiamei Zhu (2012) : Folk Songs, Text Messages and Political Communication,.
Chunyang Hu (2012): The Discourse Myth in News on Chinese Finance——Taking News On Real Estate as Cases.
Chunyang Hu (2011): Mobile Politics: Activism, Political Power and Communication Networks.
Chunyang Hu (2011): American Doctoral Education in Communication and the Implications to China.

Projects, fellowships and grants
Project "The Contentious and Activism New Media" funded by China National Humanities and Social Science Foundations since April 2011.
Project "New Media, New Rhetoric and Mass Culture in Contemporary China" funded by "985 Project" from National Social Sciences Innovation Base since October 2011. (together with Prof.Dr. Jin Cao and others)
Project "Surveillance and Safety: the New Media in Social Movements" funded by Shanghai Government for Talented Scholars since June 2009.
Project "Global New Politics: Mobile Communication and the Risk-defending in Public Administration" funded by Philosophy and Social Sciences Foundations of Shanghai since September 2007.

References

1970 births
Living people
Fudan University alumni
Academic staff of Fudan University
Sichuan University alumni